Atit Daosawang is a Thai professional footballer who plays as a centre-back for MH Nakhon Si City in Thai League 3.

Football career
Atit Daosawang is known as the youngest player to play the Thai Premier League in 2009. He debuted when he was just 16 years and 131 days old when he played for TOT-CAT F.C. against Muangthong United on 24 March 2009.

International career

Atit played for Thailand's first team against China in a friendly match, which Thailand won 5–1. He represented Thailand U23 in the 2013 Southeast Asian Games. Atit is part of Thailand's squad in the 2014 AFF Suzuki Cup.
Atit won the 2015 Southeast Asian Games with Thailand U23.

International goals

under-23

Honours

International
Thailand
 ASEAN Football Championship Winner (1) : 2014

Thailand U-23
 Sea Games  Gold Medal (2); 2013, 2015

Thailand U-19
 AFF U-19 Youth Championship (1): 2009

Thailand U-17
 AFF U-16 Youth Championship (1): 2007

Club
Muangthong United
 Thai League 1 Champions ; 2012
Chiangrai United
 Thai FA Cup (1): 2017
 Thailand Champions Cup (1): 2018

Personal life
On 22 April 2016 Atit was indefinitely disqualified from the national team for allegedly engaging in sexual activity with a 17-year-old. Atit initially denied the charges but later admitted to having had a consensual relationship with the woman. Thai coach Kiatisuk Senamuang said Atit would be suspended until he reformed his behavior.

References

External links
 
Players Profile - Thai Premier League

https://us.soccerway.com/players/atit-daosawang/181923/

1992 births
Living people
Atit Daosawang
Atit Daosawang
Atit Daosawang
Atit Daosawang
Atit Daosawang
Atit Daosawang
Atit Daosawang
Atit Daosawang
Atit Daosawang
Atit Daosawang
Atit Daosawang
Atit Daosawang
Association football defenders
Atit Daosawang
Southeast Asian Games medalists in football
Competitors at the 2013 Southeast Asian Games
Competitors at the 2015 Southeast Asian Games